Slobodan Bajić Paja (1916–1943)) was a Yugoslav Partisan and recipient of the People's Hero of Yugoslavia. He was an important leader of the Partisans in World War II in Syrmia. He was killed in battle against the Nazis in Eastern Bosnia.

Early life
Slobodan Bajić Paja was born in the village of Banovci in Croatia where he lived until age six. He was the son of a local Orthodox priest in St. Petka's Church.  From 1922, he lived in Pećinci in Serbia, where his father was transferred. He graduated from high school in Sremski Karlovci. Slobodan started participating in the work of the Communist Party of Yugoslavia while still in high school but he formally joined the party during his studies at the University of Belgrade Faculty of Philosophy in 1938.

Legacy
Elementary Schools in Indija, Pećinci, Novi Karlovci, Brestač, Donji Tovarnik, and Sremska Mitrovica bear his name. He also has a city library named after him in Ruma.

Before the Croatian War of Independence, the school in Šidski Banovci also bore his name but the Croatian government decided to rename it afterwards. However, the bust of Slobodan Bajic Paja in front of the school remains, and one of the streets in the village still bears his name. Unfortunately, at the same time a monument to Slobodan Bajic Paji together with mausoleum of 33 anti-fascist partisans in Kalesija was destroyed and the bones were then confiscated and lost by local Bosniaks authorities four months after the end of the war in Bosnia. Although the Public Television of Bosnia and Herzegovina subsequently attempted to investigate the matter, competent investigative institutions in Tuzla refused to open a formal investigation.

Honorific eponyms
 : Slobodan Bajić Paja Street, Banovci
 : Slobodan Bajić Paja Street, Pećinci
 : Elementary School Slobodan Bajić Paja in Novi Karlovci
 : Elementary School Slobodan Bajić Paja in Pećinci
 : Elementary School Slobodan Bajić Paja in Manđelos
 : Elementary School Slobodan Bajić Paja in Sremska Mitrovica
 : Public Library  Slobodan Bajić Paja in Ruma

See also
Serbs of Croatia
Banovci
Pećinci

References

Bibliography
Narodni heroji Jugoslavije(eng-People's Hero of Yugoslavia), "Mladost", Beograd 1975. godina

1916 births
1943 deaths
Yugoslav Partisans members
Serbs of Croatia
University of Belgrade Faculty of Philosophy alumni
Recipients of the Order of the People's Hero